Psychological Science, the flagship journal of the Association for Psychological Science, is a monthly, peer-reviewed, scientific journal published by SAGE Publications. The journal publishes research articles, short reports, and research reports covering all aspects of psychology. Its editor-in-chief is Patricia Bauer (Emory University).

Past editors
The following persons have been editors-in-chief:

Stephen Lindsay, University of Victoria (2015–2019)
Eric Eich, University of British Columbia (2012–2015)
Robert V. Kail, Purdue University (2007–2012)
James E. Cutting, Cornell University (2003–2007)
Sam Glucksberg, Princeton University (1999–2003)
John F. Kihlstrom, University of California, Berkeley
William Kaye Estes, Indiana University

References

Psychology journals
SAGE Publishing academic journals
Monthly journals
Association for Psychological Science academic journals